In medicine, nodules are small firm lumps, usually greater than 1 cm in diameter. If filled with fluid they are referred to as cysts. Smaller (less than 0.5 cm) raised soft tissue bumps may be termed papules.

The evaluation of a skin nodule includes a description of its appearance, its location, how it feels to touch and any associated symptoms which may give clues to an underlying medical condition.

Nodules in skin include dermatofibroma and pyogenic granuloma. Nodules may form on tendons and muscles in response to injury, and are frequently found on vocal cords. They may occur in organs such as the lung, or thyroid, or be a sign in other medical conditions such as rheumatoid arthritis.

Characteristics
Nodules are small firm lumps usually greater than 1 cm in diameter, found in skin and other organs. If filled with fluid they are usually softer and referred to as cysts. Smaller (less than 0.5 cm) raised soft tissue bumps may be termed papules.

Evaluation
The evaluation of a skin nodule includes a description of its appearance, its location, how it feels to touch and any associated symptoms which may give clues to an underlying medical condition.

Often discovered unintentionally on a chest x-ray, a single nodule in the lung requires assessment to exclude cancer.

Conditions
Nodules may form on tendons and muscles in response to injury, and are frequently found on vocal cords, They occur in conditions including endometriosis, neurofibromatosis, and in rheumatoid arthritis. They may also feature in Kaposi's sarcoma and gonorrhea.

Other examples

Reference

External links
 

Anatomical pathology
Dermatologic terminology
Dermatologic signs